Nevill Hall Hospital is a district general hospital in Abergavenny, north Monmouthshire, Wales. It is managed by the Aneurin Bevan University Health Board.

History
The site was originally occupied by The Brooks, a country house built for James Charles Hill of Blaenavon Ironworks in the 1860s. It was renamed Nevill Hall, in recognition of his own family name, when it was acquired by the Marquess of Abergavenny in 1890. After the Marquess died in 1915, it had two further owners before being sold to the local hospital board for use as a convalescent facility in 1920.

By the late 1960s the hospital needed modernising and the current facility was opened in 1970. A new education centre was officially opened by Jane Hutt AM in May 2002. 

The Accident & Emergency Department at Nevill Hall was closed in November 2020, with services being transferred to the newly opened Grange University Hospital in Cwmbran.

References

External links
Aneurin Bevan University Health Board

Hospital buildings completed in 1970
Hospitals in Monmouthshire
Hospitals established in 1970
NHS hospitals in Wales
1970 establishments in Wales
Aneurin Bevan University Health Board